The 2019–20 KNVB Cup, for sponsoring reasons officially called the TOTO KNVB Beker, was the 102nd season of the annual Dutch national football cup competition. It commenced on 17 August 2019 with the first of two preliminary rounds and was scheduled to conclude on 19 April 2020, with the final played at De Kuip in Rotterdam.  

Ajax were the defending champions, but were eliminated in the semi-finals by FC Utrecht.

The finalists were set to be Feyenoord and Utrecht but on 24 April 2020, the KNVB Cup was abandoned due to the COVID-19 pandemic in the Netherlands. The winners were planned to participate in the 2020 Johan Cruyff Shield against the 2019–20 Eredivisie champions, but due to both the Eredivisie and the KNVB Cup being abandoned, the Johan Cruyff Shield was cancelled as well.

Schedule

Matches

Preliminary rounds 
The draw for the first preliminary round Was performed by Sjaak Swart on 6 July 2019 at the Fox Sports NL & Eredivisie VoetbalFestival at the Jaarbeurs Utrecht. The draw for the second preliminary round at the same time as the draw for the first round of the main tournament at the end of August/start of September 2019

First preliminary round 
58 amateur teams qualified for this stage, although 26 received a bye to the next round, leaving 32 teams to compete for a spot in the second preliminary round. The participants are semi-finalists from the district cup tournaments, and teams from the Derde Divisie.

Second preliminary round 
In the second preliminary round, 40 amateur teams are qualified. The participants are the 28 winners of the first preliminary round, and 12 teams from the Tweede Divisie. The matches were played on 24, 25, and 26 September 2019.

 

Draw made out that HSV Hoek (4), SteDoCo (4), Sparta Nijkerk (4) and FC 's-Gravenzande (5) received a bye and are qualified for the main tournament.

Main tournament 
In the main tournament the following teams compete: 18 winners from the second preliminary round, 34 professional teams, four (replacement) period champions from the Tweede Divisie and the four teams that drew a bye in the second preliminary round. The four professional teams that have placed for the group stage of any European tournament get a bye in the first round.

First round 
The four teams that qualified for any European tournament group stage received a bye for this round. The draw was held on 31 August 2019. The matches in the first round were played on 19, 29, 30 and 31 October 2019.

Second round 
The matches of the second round took place between 17 and 19 December 2019. Ajax, PSV, Feyenoord and AZ entered in this round as they skipped the first round due to qualifying for the group stages of the Champions League or the Europa League.

Round of 16 
The matches of the round of 16 took place between 21 and 23 January 2020.

Quarter-finals 
The matches of the quarter-finals took place between 11 and 13 February 2020. From this round on the referees were assisted by video assistant referee.

Semi-finals 
The semi-finals took place on 4 and 5 March 2020.

Final

References

External link
KNVB Beker schedule 

2019–20
Netherlands
KNVB
KNVB Cup